Pecola is a CGI-animated children's television series which stars cube-shaped anthropomorphic animals in a place called Cube Town. It is based on a series of children's picture books by Naomi Iwata. It was first aired on Teletoon in Canada from September 3, 2001 with the final episode aired on September 18, 2002.  In Japan, the show aired on TV Tokyo.

Premise
The show that focuses on Pecola, a curious and hyperactive penguin who tries to help the people of Cube Town but often wreaks havoc instead.  Pecola is an orphaned penguin who lives with Pecolius, his grandfather. Cube Town is a small, isolated coastal village which contains an art museum, a beach, a lighthouse and a canal. It is located adjacent to Crescent Bay surrounded by the Rookery Mountains coastal range and serviced by regular ships (including a weekly freighter) which deliver mail, food and other supplies, as well as occasional tourists from a nearby metropolis named Cubic City. The heights above it lead into Glacier Valley which is snowbound even during summer.

Voice cast

English-language cast
 Austin Di Iulio as Pecola and Robo Pecola
 Stephanie Beard as Coco
 Richard Binsley as Jabbatt
 Donald Burda as Gazelle
 Keith Hampshire as Mayor Papazoni
 Len Carlson as Officer Kumada
 Michael Cera as Robbie Rabbit
 William Colgate as Dr. Hornbender
 Neil Crone as Dr. Chu
 Jill Frappier as Aunty Yorkshire
 Jake Goldsbie as Rudy
 George Buza as Postman Rory
 Tracey Hoyt as Hilary
 Howard Jerome as Mr Bernard
 Keith Knight as Al A. Gator
 Julie Lemieux as Miss Lucky
 Sharron Matthews as Steamer
 Marla Lukofsky as Mrs Bernard
 Miriam McDonald as Chewy
 Sunday Muse as Cori
 Scott McCord as Bashatt
 Peter Oldring as Bongo
 Stephen Ouimette as Mr. Saruyama
 Avery Saltzman as Mr Puggalski
 Adrian Truss as Mr. Lonely
 Chris Wiggins as Pecolius

Japanese-language cast
 Mayumi Asano as Pecola
 Naoko Takano as Coco
 Umeji Sasaki as Pecolius
 Paku Romi as Rabi-san
 Mayumi Asano as Rob Pecola
 Mitsuaki Hoshino as Gao-san
 Ryusei Nakao as Saru-yama
 Kenyu Horiuchi as Gazelle
 Yu Shimaka as Mayor Papazōni
 Chika Sakamoto as Tsunekichi
 Miyu Matsuki as Cori
 Takeshi Kusao as Jabatto-san
 Dai Matsumoto as Banaado-san

Characters
Pecola — A penguin who brings excitement to the otherwise dull and boring town. Unlike his fellow penguins, Pecola cannot swim. His catchphrases include "Flapping flippers!" and "Let's get hopping!" Pecola has a special love of pudding and a reputation for pulling pranks. Despite his antics, Pecola is very friendly and caring.
Little Chu/Chewy — A mouse who is the grandson of the great inventor Dr. Chu, and a budding inventor in his own right. He is Pecola's best friend and often unwilling ally in different escapades. He often complains of having a funny feeling in his stomach just before things get out of hand.
Dr. Chu — A mouse who is Little Chu's grandfather. He is Cube Town's greatest inventor and he often invents gadgets that help others on the island. His inventions are often used by Pecola and Chewy in their adventures. He is also friends with Pecola's grandfather, Pecolias. He owns two vehicles one is a submarine  and also an airplane called the Mad Mouse which sits on top his laboratory. He also likes to collect comics.
Coco — Another penguin. She is more down to earth than Pecola, and is sometimes frustrated by his antics. She loves to sing; unfortunately, she is terrible at it.
Mr. Saruyama — A monkey who runs a fruit stand in town. He is often the target of Pecola's pranks, often leading to his melons falling over, which is a running gag in the show. However, he cares very much about Pecola, no matter what he does. He also runs the town's newspaper, the "Town Crier". He also cries a lot.
Gao/Rory — A lion who is Cube Town's postman.
Pug/Mr. Puggalski — A dog who owns a grocery store. He is a descendant of the personal chef of the former king of Cube Town. He is also said to be the world's greatest hide and seek player (hide and go sleep) though when nobody could find him he was sick at home and still won.
Dr. Hornbender — An old goat astrologist who lives and works at the observatory. His greatest dream is the discovery of new planets, constellations, and aliens. Along with getting a shooting star named after him.
Rabi/Robbie — A nervous rabbit who likes video games.
Mayor Papazoni — An elephant. The mayor who makes long and boring speeches. Papazoni travels in a helicopter that he pilots himself. He hides in secret tunnels under the city and at a Mayoral Retreat to work on his speeches, undisturbed by residents and their questions. Constantly refers to the citizens of Cube Town as "voters". His voice is an imitation of veteran newsman Walter Cronkite.
Steam / Stim / Steamer — A cat train mechanic and engineer. Chewy, Pecola, and Rudy are smitten with her, which is the cause of tensions and arguments among the three. Her train, The Cactus, is intended eventually to provide a direct link with Cubic City via a tunnel being constructed under the Rookery Mountains . She often stops her work on the engine to play soccer with Pecola and his friends. 
Aunty Yorkshire — A pig who does the laundry for the town and is often one of the few adults tolerant of Pecola's shenanigans. Whenever Pecolius is away she's the one to often babysit Pecola. She also has a son who lives in Cubic City and often says Pecola reminds her of him.
Mr. and Mrs. Banard/Bernard — Two beagles. They run the town's bakery, though Mr. Bernard often falls asleep on the job and is credited by others for his wife's work.
Jabatt and Bashatt — Two tortoises. They are Cube Town's firemen, although there are never fires in Cube Town. Despite this, they often help out around town, and they often provide comic relief when they bump into each other.
Officer Kumada — A bear. He helps keep the Cube Town safe with his many rules and observations.
Mr. Lonely - A wolf. He is a poet who is actually found writing and reciting sad poetry. He also once rapped. In Coco's concert  but is unable to write poetry when in a happy mood.
Gazelle — A vain gazelle who is Hillary's boyfriend. He dreams of being a modern artist.  He owns a convertible that he lovingly maintains and often drives about in Cube Town. He also owns a jet ski. In addition to art he loves to collect belt buckles.
Srally/Hillary - A giraffe who is Gazelle's girlfriend. She owns Cube Town Art Museum and is very fashionable. She is also picky about her weight, which is a running gag in the show.
Miss Lucky — A blue cat who reports for Cube Town News. She also helped Pecola make a movie.
Golagola/Gola Gola — A friendly sea creature who saved Pecola from drowning. At first, the town feared him, but they came to accept him. He has helped with different beach activities  and is often seen playing with Pecola and his friends at the beach. 
Tsunekichi/Rudy — Pecola's fox friend whose catchphrases are "I knew that" and "I was going to say/ask that". He is prone to bragging and showing off his latest toys, not sharing and declaring he is the best at whatever activity he is engaged in. 
Cori — A squirrel that runs Cori's Cafe as chef and waitperson.
Bongo — A very strong and athletic gorilla who is kind, but is often clumsy as he either bumps into something or breaks something though apologizes for it with a trademark "Sorry". In  it was revealed he collects model cars.
Pecolius — A penguin. Pecola's grandfather who bears a resemblance to Indiana Jones because of his adventures in the name of science and archeology. He appreciates Pecola's unique personality, but at times reminds him to stay out of trouble.
Robo-Pecola — A robot version of Pecola who was built by Dr. Chu to teach Pecola better manners as revealed in his debut in. Though his various glitches lead him to cause more trouble than the real Pecola. But like Pecola, Robo-Pecola is very friendly and caring.
Alligetao/Al Agator — A mysterious alligator. He is seen sneaking around Cube Town, taking pictures.
Brock the Block — A badger who is a reporter in Cubic City who hosts and interviewed the show "Big City Life" where he interviews successful people in Cubic City.
Power Pal — A gorilla superhero on TV that is Pecola's favourite. He looks like Bongo except wearing red superhero tights, cape, and mask. He can fly and has super strength. He inspired Pecola become Power Pecola RobotMania.

Episodes

Season 1 (2001)

Season 2 (2002)

Telecast and home media
Pecola first aired on Teletoon in Canada from September 3, 2001 with the final episode aired on September 18, 2002 with repeats until the mid-2000s. In Japan, the show aired on TV Tokyo at 9.00am to 9.30am on Sundays from October 6, 2002 until March 30, 2003. In 2003, Pecola premiered on Cartoon Network in the U.S., and also aired on the now-defunct Qubo from 2007 to 2017, then started airing again on April 5, 2020. It left Qubo on July 26, 2020. The show also aired on Spacetoon in Indonesia from 2005 until 2013.

The show was released to DVD in Japan, Australia, France, and Taiwan. A DVD release of the show in the U.S. has yet to be announced; however, it is available on Amazon Video in the country.

Video game
In Japan, an educational game based on the show was released for the Sega Pico entitled Pecola no Daibouken Maboroshi no Aisukurīmu wo Sagase! (ペコラのだいぼうけん まぼろしのアイスクリームをさがせ!)

References

External links
Milky Cartoon homepage
Milky Cartoon's Pecola page

2000s Canadian animated television series
2001 Canadian television series debuts
2002 Canadian television series endings
Canadian computer-animated television series
Canadian children's animated comedy television series
Canadian children's animated fantasy television series
Japanese children's animated comedy television series
Japanese children's animated fantasy television series
Canadian television shows based on children's books
Animated television series about penguins
Animated television series about orphans
English-language television shows
Japanese-language television shows
Japanese computer-animated television series
Teletoon original programming
Television series by Nelvana
Qubo